The Governor of Imo State is an elective political position. He's one of the governors of the thirty-six states in Nigeria. The governor of Imo State is the chief executive officer of Imo state and its executive branch with the assistance of the Deputy Governor (his political running-mate). Fourteen different people have served as governor of Imo State; 8 military governors, 2 military administrators and 7 democratic governors since the state was created in 1976. The current governor of the state is Hope Uzodinma of the All Progressives Congress, in office since January 15, 2020.

Duties and functions 
Governor in his official capacity appoints the principal state officers, Commissioners, Heads of State Ministries, State Judicial officers, Permanent Secretaries and other Heads of Department. The Governor doesn't belong to the State House of Assembly. The Governor oversees all the functions of the Executive cadre of the Government of Imo State.

Executive powers
Most executive power lies with the governor whose responsibility is to enforce state laws. The governor serves as the head of government with supreme authority over the Executive Council. Excluding the deputy governor, the governor appoints commissioners, heads of government agencies, special advisers and judicial officers subject to the House's approval. The governor has the duty to attract investments, promote business and implement political as well as economic initiatives. The governor in his executive capacity also serves as the Chief Security Officer of the State.

Legislative powers
Under the Constitution, every bill passed by the Imo House of Assembly must be presented to the governor for approval before it becomes law. The governor may choose to sign it and make it law, veto it and return it to the House, or take no action, however. If the governor vetoes the bill, a two-thirds majority of the House may override it, and the bill will become act without the governor's signature. If the governor does not act, the bill will automatically become Law after a 30-day period.

Judicial powers
Judicial officers are appointed by the governor on the recommendation of the National Judicial Council subject to confirmation of the appointment by the Imo State House of Assembly. Should a vacancy arise in the office of the Chief Judge or the President of the Customary Court of Appeal, the governor can appoint the next most senior judge of those courts to act for a period of three months.

Section 212, subsection (1) and (2) further empowers the chief executive to issue pardons and reprieves, commute sentences, or remit fines and forfeitures imposed for the commission of offenses against, or for the violation of the state laws.

Oath of office 
The oath of office is administered by the Chief Judge of the state who is appointed by the Governor. The oath of office is carried out on the inaugural day of the new government in the state which is especially on the day of tenure expiration of the preceding government or otherwise stipulated by a Higher Court in Nigeria.

Qualification 
The governor and deputy governor are directly elected on the same ticket by popular vote for four-year terms, and are limited to two consecutive terms, for a total of eight years. Qualifications required for an individual aspiring to become the Governor of Imo State is contained in section 177 of the 1999 Constitution. According to the constitution, an individual meeting the following eligibility criteria may serve as governor. The candidate must be:

a. (35) years of age

b. A citizen of Imo State by birth

c. A member of a political party in Nigeria already registered by the Independent National Electoral Commission (INEC) with an endorsement by that political party.

d. School Certificate level or its equivalent

Removal from office 
Although a governor is normally elected to serve a complete four-year term during the national elections, in exceptional cases, before a term of such four years expires, the officeholder may be replaced or removed as the case may be, through death, impeachment or if an election is annulled by a “competent” court of law or by a two-thirds majority of the House of Assembly. As seen in the case of Emeka Ihedioha and the incumbent governor Hope Uzodinma

Past and Incumbent governors

See also 

 Imo State
 Executive Council of Imo State
 List of Governors of Imo State

External links

References 

Imo State politicians